Thierry Depaulis (born 1949) is an independent historian of games and especially of playing cards, card games, and board games. He is President of the International Playing-Card Society, President of the association Le Vieux Papier, a member of the editorial board of the International Board Game Studies Association, and a member of the board of directors of the foundation of the Swiss Museum of Games.

He has published a number of articles and books in the field of games and playing cards and has contributed to the French gaming journal Jeux et Stratégie for several years.

Since 2016, he has collaborated with the ENCCRE group.

Publications 
 Tarot, jeu et magie, Bibliothèque Nationale, 1984 
 Jeux de hasard sur papier: les "loteries" de salon, Le Vieux Papier, 1987
 "Ombre et lumière. Un peu de lumière sur l'hombre", in The Playing-Card, XV-4, XVI-1, XVI-2, 1987  
 Les cartes de la Révolution: cartes à jouer et propagande (catalogue d'exposition), Issy-les-Moulineaux, Musée Français de la Carte à Jouer, 1989
 Les cartes à jouer au "portrait de Paris" avant 1701, Le Vieux Papier, 1991
 Les loix du jeu : bibliographie de la littérature technique de jeux de cartes en français avant 1800. Suivie d'un supplément couvrant les années 1800-1850, Paris, Cymbalum Mundi, 1994
 'Storia dei tarocchi liguri-piemontesi', dans Antichi tarocchi liguri-piemontesi, with Giordano Berti and Marisa Chiesa, Torino, 1995, 
 A Wicked Pack of Cards: The Origins of the Occult Tarot, London, Duckworth, 1996 (with Ronald Decker and Sir Michael Dummett) 
 Histoire du bridge, Paris, Bornemann, 1997 
 Les jeux de hasard en Savoie-Piémont sous l'Ancien Régime, in Études Savoisiennes, 4, 1995
 Inca dice and board games, dans Board Games Studies, 1, 1998
 Le livre du jeu de dames, Paris, Bornemann, 1999 (with Philippe Jeanneret)
 différents articles sur les divers aspects des jeux in l' Encyclopædia Universalis, 1999
 La plus ancienne représentation datée de joueurs de dames (1492), in Board Game Studies, 7, 2004 (with Jean Simonata)
 Cartes et cartiers dans les anciens États de Savoie (1400-1860), North Walsham, International Playing-Card Society, 2005 (IPCS Papers, 4)
 Petite histoire du poker. Paris, Editions Pole / Cymbalum Mundi, 2008 
 De Lisboa a Macáçar : um capítulo desconhecido das cartas portuguesas na Ásia / De Lisbonne à Macassar : un chapitre méconnu des cartes portugaises en Asie, Lisbonne, Apenas, 2008 (Bisca Lambida, 10)
 Temps nouveaux, jeux nouveaux (ainsi qu'une quarantaine de notices, écrites ou coécrites), in Ève Netchine (ed.), Jeux de princes, jeux de vilains, Paris, Bibliothèque nationale de France / Le Seuil, 2009 
 Explaining the Tarot : two Italian Renaissance essays on the meaning of the Tarot pack (with Ross Caldwell and Marco Ponzi), Oxford : Maproom, 2010
 Le Tarot révélé : une histoire du tarot d’après les documents, La Tour-de-Peilz : Swiss Museum of Games, 2013

References

External links 

20th-century French historians
Card game historians
Tabletop game writers
Writers from Bordeaux
1949 births
Living people
Card game book writers
Contract bridge writers